Luzhany is an urban-type settlement in Chernivtsi Raion (district) of Chernivtsi Oblast (province) in western Ukraine. It belongs to Mamaivtsi rural hromada, one of the hromadas of Ukraine.

As of the 2001 census, the town's population is 4,744. Current population:

History
First mentioned in a 1452 deed, Luzhany belonged to the Danubian Principality of Moldavia until 1774/75, when upon the Russo-Turkish War its northwestern parts (the Bukovina) were ceded to the Habsburg monarchy. Incorporated into the Austrian Duchy of Bukovina from 1849, the area fell to Greater Romania after World War I. In 1940, the Romanian state agreed to cede Northern Bukovina to the Soviet Union, as provided for by the Molotov-Ribbentrop pact. Luzhany became part of independent Ukraine in 1991.

Until 18 July 2020, Luzhany belonged to Kitsman Raion. The raion was abolished in July 2020 as part of the administrative reform of Ukraine, which reduced the number of raions of Chernivtsi Oblast to three. The area of Kitsman Raion was split between Chernivtsi Raion and Vyzhnytsia Raion, with Luzhany being transferred to Chernivtsi Raion.

People from Luzhany
Vladimir Katriuk (1921 – 2015), Canadian man of Ukrainian ancestry, accused of war crimes
 Yuriy Shelepnytskyi (born 1965), Ukrainian professional football coach and former player for FC Bukovyna Chernivtsi.

See also
 FC Luzhany (Chernivtsi Oblast)

References

External links

Urban-type settlements in Chernivtsi Raion
Bukovina
Populated places established in the 1450s
Populated places on the Prut